Albacete Basket, also known as Arcos Albacete Basket for sponsorship reasons, is a basketball club based in Albacete, Castile-La Mancha that currently plays in LEB Oro, the second tier of Spanish basketball.

History
Albacete Basket was founded in 2012 as a merger of the senior teams of the city's two clubs (CABA and EBA) with the aim to be the main basketball reference in Albacete.

After playing four seasons in Liga EBA, it was promoted to LEB Plata in the 2015–16 season, in its third consecutive appearance in the promotion play-offs and just after resigning to an invitation of the Spanish Basketball Federation in the previous season.

In their debut season in LEB Plata, the club was relegated after losing on the last matchday against Zamora, but was able to remain in the league by achieving one of the vacant berths.

Sponsorship naming
Arcos Albacete Basket 2015–present

Current roster

Season by season

Notable players

References

External links
Club website

Basketball teams in Castilla–La Mancha
Sport in Albacete
Basketball teams established in 2012
2012 establishments in Spain
Former Liga EBA teams
LEB Plata teams